Copelatus agrias is a species of diving beetle. It is part of the genus Copelatus in the subfamily Copelatinae of the family Dytiscidae. It was described by Guignot in 1954.

References

agrias
Beetles described in 1954